Plavsky District  is an administrative district (raion), one of the twenty-three in Tula Oblast, Russia. As a municipal division, it is incorporated as Plavsky Municipal District. It is located in the southwestern central part of the oblast. Its administrative center is the town of Plavsk. Population: 27,778 (2010 Census);  The population of Plavsk accounts for 58.2% of the district's total population.

References

Notes

Sources

Districts of Tula Oblast